New York–London–Paris–Munich (styled New York · London · Paris · Munich) is M's first album, released in 1979, the title being taken from a line in the verse of the March 1979 hit single "Pop Muzik", an extended version of which is featured on the album.

Cash Box said of the single "Moonlight and Muzak" that it uses "synthesized electronic effects to create an airy Latin rhythm behind [M. Robin Scott's] spoken vocals."

Record World said that that the single "That's the Way the Money Goes" is a "loveable electronic dancer here that's sure to be a staple on AOR and the club circuit," particularly praising the keyboards.

Track listings

Original 12" LP
All songs written by Robin Scott.

Side A
 "Pop Muzik" – 5:00
 "Woman Make Man" – 2:18
 "Moderne Man/Satisfy Your Lust" – 6:32
 "Made in Munich" – 5:36
Side B
 "Moonlight and Muzak" – 5:36
 "That's the Way the Money Goes" – 4:27
 "Cowboys and Indians" – 3:54
 "Unite Your Nation" – 5:44

1997 re-release
This is the track listing for the 1997 re-release of the album in the United Kingdom by Westside Records, which featured 11 bonus tracks.  The "Pop Muzik" tracks were spelled as "Popmuzik" here.
 "Popmuzik" '79 (Nick Launay 12" Mix) – 4:56
 "Woman Make Man" – 2:18
 "Moderne Man/Satisfy Your Lust" – 6:32
 "Made in Munich" – 5:36
 "Moonlight and Muzak" – 5:36
 "That's the Way the Money Goes" – 4:27
 "Cowboys and Indians" – 3:54
 "Unite Your Nation" – 5:44
Bonus Tracks
"Fanfare" – 0:08
"Cry Myself to Sleep" – 2:59
"Cowboys and Indians" (Dead or a 'Live' Mix) – 3:11
"Cowboys and Indians" (Featuring James Stewart) – 3:40
"Satisfy Your Love" (Single Version) – 3:12
"Modern Man" (Single Version) – 3:31
"M Factor" (Single Version) – 2:26
"M Factor" (U.S. Single Version) – 2:29
"Moonlight and Muzak" ('92 Remix) – 4:43
"Popmuzik" (Hip–Hop–Pop Muzik) – 3:10
"Popmuzik" (Latino Cappuccino) – 1:56
"Popmuzik" ('89 Reshuffle)" – 3:53
<li>"Finale" – 0:14

2002 re-release
This is the track listing for the 2002 re-release of the album in the United States by Razor & Tie, which featured five bonus tracks and was retitled "Pop Muzik".
 "Pop Muzik" – 4:56
 "Woman Make Man" – 2:18
 "Moderne Man/Satisfy Your Lust" – 6:32
 "Made in Munich" – 5:36
 "Moonlight and Muzak" – 5:36
 "That's the Way the Money Goes" – 4:27
 "Cowboys and Indians" – 3:54
 "Unite Your Nation" – 5:44
Bonus Tracks
"M Factor" – 2:26
"Pop Muzik" (Hip-Hop-Pop Muzik) – 3:10
"Cowboys and Indians" (Dead or a 'Live' Mix) – 3:11
"Moonlight and Muzak" ('92 Remix) – 4:43
<li>"Pop Muzik" ('89 Reshuffle) – 3:53

Charts

Personnel
Robin Scott – vocals, Roland Jupiter synthesizer, guitar, producer
Brigit Novik Vinchon – harmony vocals
Wally Badarou – keyboards, synthesizers
Julian Scott – bass
Philip Gould – drums, percussion
Gary Barnacle – saxophone, flute
David Bowie – handclaps
The Philharmonic Odd-Job Orchestra - orchestra on "Moderne Man/Satisfy Your Lust", arranged by Bobby Richards

Production
Arranged & Produced By Robin Scott
David Richards, Rafe McKenna, Tim Hunt - engineer
Rafe McKenna & Tim Hunt - recording, mixing
All Titles Published by Platinum Productions International, except tracks 1 & 3 (Pop Muzik Ltd.)
Stan Kerr - front cover illustration

References

1979 debut albums
M (band) albums
MCA Records albums
Sire Records albums